Elastic Path is a headless commerce system, allowing template-less eCommerce to be integrated as middleware into Enterprise ERP systems. The system is API based and is specifically targeted towards Enterprise level Organisations. Elastic Path is a private company based in Vancouver, British Columbia, Canada with sales offices in the UK and US.

Gartner's Magic Quadrant for Digital Commerce 2020 named Elastic Path as a Visionary in e-commerce applications. The evaluation was based on Elastic Path's completeness of vision and ability to execute.

History 
Elastic Path was started by Harry Chemko in 2000, with co-founders Mark Williams, Dave Koo, Ryan Orr, and Jason Billingsley, after completing university with a $15,000 start-up loan from a non-profit organisation.

Management 
On 19 August 2020, Elastic Path reported it had hired Jamus Driscoll as Chief Executive Officer. Founder and former CEO of Elastic Path, Harry Chemko, will carry on the position of the Founder and Chief Strategy Officer, reporting to Driscoll.

Clients 
Elastic Path has more than 200 clients worldwide including Symantec, Time Inc, Virgin Media, LVMH, Devry, SAS, Vancouver  2010 Winter Olympics and Paralympic Games.

Java Ecommerce Platform 
Elastic Path’s Java ecommerce platform is based on open source technologies such as Spring Framework, Apache OpenJPA, Eclipse RCP, Apache Solr, Apache Velocity, Groovy, Direct Web Remoting, jQuery and more.

References

Companies established in 2000
2000 establishments in Canada
Software companies of Canada
Companies based in Vancouver